This is a list of singles that charted in the top ten of the Billboard Argentina Hot 100 chart in 2022.

Top-ten singles
Key
 – indicates single's top 10 entry was also its Hot 100 debut

2021 peaks

2023 peaks

See also
 List of Billboard Argentina Hot 100 number-one singles of 2022

Notes 

Notes for re-entries

References

Argentina Hot 100 Top Ten Singles
Argentine record charts
Argentina 2022